Sir (Richard) Walter Essex (13 January 1857 – 15 September 1941) was a British businessman and Liberal Party politician.

The eldest son of John Essex, he established a wallpaper printing business. He entered local politics in the Wandsworth area of south London. At the 1900 general election he was selected by the Liberal Party to contest the seat of Lambeth, Kennington, but failed to be elected. At the next general election in 1906 he was elected as Member of Parliament for Cirencester in Gloucestershire. He held the seat until January 1910 when he was defeated by his Conservative opponent, Benjamin Bathurst. He returned to the Commons at the election of December 1910, when he was elected to represent Stafford. He was knighted in 1913 and made an honorary freeman of Stafford. Following a redistribution of seats, Essex stood at the new seat of Stoke-on-Trent, Burslem at the 1918 general election but was not elected.

Essex was twice married: to Marie Chinchen of Swanage, Dorset in 1881. Following her death in 1883 he married Lizzie Benson of Newcastle upon Tyne in 1885, with whom he had four children. He died at his home at Bourton on the Water, Gloucestershire in September 1941.

References

External links 
 

1857 births
1941 deaths
Liberal Party (UK) MPs for English constituencies
UK MPs 1906–1910
UK MPs 1910–1918
English Methodists
People from Bourton-on-the-Water
Members of the Parliament of the United Kingdom for Stafford